The Borden Tunnel is a 957-foot long, formerly abandoned, railway tunnel located about 2.5 miles (4 km) north of Frostburg, Maryland. The tunnel is lit with a series of motion activated LED lights powered by a solar panel located just north of the tunnel. It is now part of the Great Allegheny Passage rail trail.

The Western Maryland Railway built the tunnel in 1911 for its Connellsville Subdivision. The rail line was abandoned in 1975.

References

 Western Maryland Railway Co., Baltimore, MD (1955). "Track Chart: Connellsville to Cumberland."

External links
 Borden Tunnel map and photos - WMWestSub.com

Tunnels in Allegany County, Maryland
Railroad tunnels in Maryland
Rail trails in Maryland
Western Maryland Railway tunnels
Tunnels completed in 1911